Esther Galil (born May 28, 1945) is a Morocco-born, Los Angeles-based French and Israeli singer and painter. Her song "Le jour se lève" was Number 1 in France for four weeks in September 1971.

In December 1972, Galil noted with regret the excessive European influence on the culture of Brazil.

Discography

Studio albums 

 Ma Liberté (1974)
 Z. Land (1976)
 Esther Galil (2005)

Compilation albums 

 80's (2006)
 90's (2006)
 70's (2013) (download-only)

Extended plays 

 Oh! Non (1966) (released as 'Jackie Galil')

Singles 

 "תחפושת חדשה" (tr. "New Costume") (1969) (released as 'Jackie Galil' in Israel only) 
 "J’attends l’homme" (1971)
 "Le jour se lève" (1971) – No. 1 France, No. 6 Belgium
 "Oh Lord" (1971) – No. 46 France, No. 45 Belgium
 "Les fusils" (1972)
 "Amour ma délivrance" (1972)
 "Ma liberté" (1972) – No. 31 France
 "Delta Queen" (1972)
 "Bald kommt der Morgen (Le jour se lève)" (1972)
 "Shalom dis-moi shalom" (1973)
 "Cherche l’amour" (1973)
 "Das Mädchen, das dich liebt" (1973)
 "Harlem Song" (1973) – No. 19 France
 "Sonja, komm zurück" (1973)
 "On est fait pour vivre ensemble" (1974)
 "Le cri de la terre" (1974)
 "Ma vérité" (1975)
 "With You" (1975)
 "Je m’en vais" (1976)
 "Bossana" (1976)
 "Route number infini" (1977)
 "Lover for Ever" (1978)
 "All or Nothing" (1979)
 "Les mots qui fâchent" (1980)
 "En dehors du blues" (1982)
 "Interdit par la loi" (1988)

References

1945 births
Living people
People from Safi, Morocco
People from Los Angeles
20th-century Israeli women singers
20th-century French women singers
American people of Moroccan-Jewish descent
Israeli women painters
French women painters